Qızılqaya is a village in the municipality of Goygol in the Goygol Rayon of Azerbaijan.

References

External links

Populated places in Goygol District